Khreibeh    is a village in the  Baalbek District in Baalbek-Hermel Governorate.

History
In 1838, Eli Smith noted  el-Khureibeh  as a Metawileh village in the Baalbek area.

References

Bibliography

External links
Khreibeh,  Localiban

Populated places in Baalbek District
Shia Muslim communities in Lebanon